The 2016 Provo Premier League is the sixteenth season of the top football division in the Turks and Caicos Islands. The season began on 9 January 2016.

Table

References 

Provo Premier League
Turks
Turks